Heathcote railway station is located on the Illawarra line, serving the Sydney suburb of Heathcote. It is served by Sydney Trains T4 line services and limited NSW TrainLink South Coast line services.

History
Heathcote station opened on 9 March 1886 as Loftus station when the Illawarra line was extended from Sutherland to Waterfall. Upgrades to the station, including a new footbridge with lifts, were completed in January 2017. The contract for these upgrades was awarded in July 2015.

Platforms & services

Transport links
Transdev NSW operates two routes via Heathcote station:
991: Heathcote to Sutherland station
996: Engadine to Heathcote East

References

External links

Heathcote station details Transport for New South Wales

Easy Access railway stations in Sydney
Railway stations in Sydney
Railway stations in Australia opened in 1886
Illawarra railway line
Heathcote, New South Wales